The FTBOA Florida Sire Stakes In Reality division is the fifth leg of the Florida Thoroughbred Breeders' & Owners' Association (FTBOA) Florida Sire series. It has been run on dirt over a distance of six furlongs since inception. The race was named in honor of the Florida-bred champion stakes winner and sire In Reality who was often referred to as a "sire of sires." The In Reality Stakes has been run in two divisions on two separate occasions in 1983 and 1986.

History
Inaugurated at Calder Race Course in 1982, it was part of the Florida Stallion Stakes series through 2013 after which Calder's racing operations were leased to the Stronach Group, operators of Gulfstream Park.

Records
Speed record: (at the distance of 7 furlongs)
 1999 Kiss a Native (1:44.52)

Most wins by a jockey:
 3 – Julio Garcia (2000, 2003, 2006)

Most wins by a trainer:

 5 – Stanley I. Gold (2009, 2011, 2013, 2014, 2015)

Most wins by an owner:

 5 – Jacks or Better Farm, Inc. (2009, 2011, 2013, 2014, 2015)

Winners

Second Division winners

References

Horse races in Florida
Flat horse races for two-year-olds
Recurring sporting events established in 1982
Gulfstream Park
Calder Race Course
1982 establishments in Florida